Rigo may refer to:

People
 Rigo 23, a Portuguese artist active in San Francisco, California
 Blessed Rigo, also known as Henry of Treviso, a medieval Italian saint
 Frank Rigo (c. 1868–1936), American opera director in Australia
 Marek Rigo, a Slovak footballer
 Ondrej Rigo, the most prolific serial killer in the history of Slovakia
 Rigo Tovar, a Mexican cumbia singer
 Rigoberto 'Rigo' Urán, a Colombian professional road cyclist

Other
 Staff (music) (from Italian usage)
 Rīga, the capital of Latvia
 Rigó (Hungarian) may refer to the bird Fekete rigó (Turdus merula) or to the pastry Rigó Jancsi